Hawthorne Airport may refer to:

 Hawthorne Municipal Airport (disambiguation)
 Hawthorne Municipal Airport (California) or Jack Northrop Field in Hawthorne, California, United States (FAA: HHR)
 Hawthorne Industrial Airport, formerly Hawthorne Municipal Airport in Hawthorne, Nevada, United States (FAA: HTH)
 Hawthorne-Feather Airpark in Deering, New Hampshire, United States (FAA: 8B1)
 Hawthorne Field in Kountze/Silsbee, Texas, United States (FAA: 45R)

See also
 Hawthorne Municipal Airport (disambiguation)